David Dalessandro is a University of Pittsburgh administrator, currently serving as the associate vice chancellor of university development.  Outside of his service to the Pitt community, Dalessandro is best known as the unlikely creator of Snakes on a Plane. Citing as inspiration an article he read about World War II pilots having trouble in the Pacific with snakes sneaking into cargo holds, he penned the original screenplay for the 2006 Samuel L. Jackson thriller in 1992 and developed the script for the following years. In 1995, Dalessandro pitched the script to 30 different movie studios and was rejected by all of them, until New Line Cinema accepted it in 2004.

On the reason he wrote the screenplay Dalessandro has said: "People say, 'I hate snakes and I hate to fly.' These are animals that are both worshipped and feared. I don't know if it goes back to the Bible thing. Snakes and you in an enclosed area -- you can't get off the plane. You're trapped. People want to be scared, exhilarated. Being terrified is very much a part of the American movie-going public."

Although Snakes on a Plane was Dalessandro's first major big screen success, he has written several other screenplays. In 1998, he was a finalist in the Academy of Motion Picture Arts and Sciences-sponsored Don and Gee Nicholl Fellowships in Screenwriting competition for his script Rough and Tumble, about an amateur football team in Western Pennsylvania in 1918. In 1997, Dalessandro's Bridge of Sighs was a finalist at the Austin Film Festival.

References

External links

Writers from Pittsburgh
American male screenwriters
Living people
Screenwriters from Pennsylvania
Year of birth missing (living people)